The Army Black Knights men's soccer program represents the United States Military Academy (West Point) in all NCAA Division I men's college soccer competitions. Founded in 1921, the Black Knights compete in the Patriot League. The Black Knights play in the Patriot League and are coached by Russell Payne, a former goalkeeper who played in the A-League (the United Soccer League's second division predecessor). Army plays their home matches at Clinton Field in West Point, New York.

In 1945, Army was declared co-national champions by the Intercollegiate Soccer Football Association, the predecessor to the NCAA, making it the only season Army won a national championship of any kind in men's college soccer. Much of the program's success in NCAA came in the 1960s, when they were regulars in the NCAA Division I Men's Soccer Championship. From 1963 until 1967 Army reached the College Cup (final four) for four consecutive seasons, although the program never managed to reach the national championship. The program regularly made appearances through the mid-1970s before having a dip in form. The program once again qualified for the NCAA Tournament in 1996, but have failed to qualify since then.

Several notable military personnel and professional soccer players played for the Black Knights including Winston Boldt.

Roster

Rivalries 

Navy — Mirrored off of the neutral site football rivalry, Navy and Army play annually at Talen Energy Stadium in Chester, Pennsylvania. The match is deemed the Army–Navy Cup

Team honors

National championships 
ISFA National Co-Champion (1): 1945

Conference championships 
Patriot League Men's Soccer Tournament (3): 1991, 1993, 1996
Patriot League Men's Soccer Regular Season (2): 1992, 1996

Individual honors

National honors 

CoSIDA Academic All-American
 First Team'
 2007: Daniel Newell
 Second Team
 2008: A.J. Glubzinski
 2013: Winston Boldt
 Third Team
 2009: Andrew Kydes
ECAC All-Star
 2014: Winston Boldt

Conference honors 
The following players for Army have been honored with Patriot League  honors since the league began sponsoring men's soccer in 1990:

Patriot League Men's Soccer Offensive Player of the Year
 1996: A.J. Florkowski
Patriot League Men's Soccer Goalkeeper of the Year
 2013: Winston Boldt
 2014: Winston Boldt
Patriot League Men's Soccer Coach of the Year
 1991: Joe Chiavaro
 1996: Joe Chiavaro
Patriot League Men's Soccer Tournament MVP
 1996: A.J. Florkowski
 1993: Tony Dedmond
Patriot League All-Decade Team (1990-2000)
 Tony ParilliPatriot League Men's Soccer Scholar Athlete the Year'''
 2006: Bill Watts
 2007: Daniel Newell
 2008: A.J. Glubzinkski
 2009: Andrew Kydes

Seasons

Year-by-year

NCAA Tournament history 
Army has appeared in 12 NCAA Tournaments, including four College Cup appearances. Their most recent performance came in 1996. Their combined NCAA record is 10–12–1.

References

External links 

 

 
1921 establishments in New York (state)
Association football clubs established in 1921
Military soccer clubs in the United States